Berthold Louis Ullman (August 18, 1882 in Chicago, Illinois – June 26, 1965 in Vatican City) was an American Classical scholar.

Ullman was born in Chicago to Louis Ullman and Eleanora Fried. He was educated at the University of Chicago (A.B. 1903, Ph.D. 1908).  He joined the faculty at Chicago and also taught at the University of Pittsburgh and Iowa State University. He taught at the University of Chicago from 1925 until 1944 before moving to the University of North Carolina at Chapel Hill, becoming Kenan professor of Latin and department chair.  Ullman's library collection formed the core of the present classics department library at the University of North Carolina.  Ullman was also president of the American Philological Association in 1935. In 1948, he was elected as a member of the American Academy of Arts and Sciences.

He married Mary Louise Bates on September 1, 1909. Their son Edward Ullman, born in 1912, became a geographer.

As a scholar Ullman focused on Latin language, the manuscript tradition of ancient texts, and Latin in the Renaissance.

Books
Ullman, Berthold Louis, Norman E. Henry, Charles Henderson Latin for Americans (frequently revised, still in print)
Ullman, Berthold Louis Sicconis Polentonis Scriptorum Illustrium Latinae Linguae Libri XVIII, 1928
Ullman, Berthold Louis Ancient Writing and its Influence, 1932
Ullman, Berthold Louis Coluccii Salutati De Laboribus Herculis, 2 volumes, 1951
Ullman, Berthold Louis Studies in the Italian Renaissance 1955
Ullman, Berthold Louis Colucii Salutati De seculo et religione 1957
Ullman, Berthold Louis The Origin and Development of Humanistic Script 1960
Ullman, Berthold Louis, Philip A. Stadter The Public Library of Renaissance Florence 1972

References

External links
 

Ullman, Berthold Louis
Ullman, Berthold Louis
Ullman, Berthold Louis
Ullman, Berthold Louis
Ullman, Berthold Louis
Iowa State University faculty
Classical scholars of the University of Chicago
American Latinists
Fellows of the American Academy of Arts and Sciences
Fellows of the Medieval Academy of America